Hegi Castle is a castle in the city of Winterthur of the canton of Zurich in Switzerland. It is a Swiss heritage site of national significance.

See also
 List of castles in Switzerland

References

External links
 Schloss Hegi - 
 

Cultural property of national significance in the canton of Zürich
Castles in the canton of Zürich
Museums in the canton of Zürich
Historic house museums in Switzerland